Busch Gardens Tampa Bay is a  animal theme park located in Tampa, Florida, United States, with the entire park landscaped and designed around themes of Africa and Asia. Owned and operated by SeaWorld Parks & Entertainment, the park opened on June 1, 1959. The park has an annual attendance consistently exceeding 4 million, often ranking second among SeaWorld parks behind SeaWorld Orlando. The park features many roller coasters and thrill rides, including a Dive Coaster called SheiKra, a "family-style" thrill coaster themed around cheetahs called Cheetah Hunt, a launched roller coaster called Tigris, a classic seated steel roller coaster called Kumba, a wood-steel hybrid hypercoaster called  Iron Gwazi, Falcon's Fury (the second-tallest free-standing drop tower in North America, and one of few to tilt and face riders towards the ground), and Montu, which was the tallest and fastest inverted roller coaster in the world when it opened. The park also features several rides and attractions aimed for children under the age of nine, as well as two water rides — a river rafting ride and a classic log flume.

History

1957–1959: Busch Brewery and Gardens 

Anheuser-Busch proposed acquiring land in Florida to develop a brewery with Tampa and Jacksonville as potential sites in April 1957. By June, unconfirmed rumors were reported that a $25–30 million brewery would be built in Tampa, Florida, but were initially denied by Anheuser-Busch. Anheuser-Busch made public on July 25, that it had purchased a  plot of land in Tampa for $320,000 to construct a $20 million brewery. The construction of the Tampa brewery coincided with the construction of a competing brewery in the Tampa Industrial Park complex by Schlitz. For the planning of the brewery, August Busch Jr. remarked Anheuser-Busch wanted to include gardens to attract the local community and contribute landscaped areas. Busch Jr. held the opinion that functional parks could help widen Anheuser-Busch's interest.

In March 1958, August Busch Jr. commemorated the groundbreaking for the Tampa brewery. Construction took place through the rest of 1958 and the early months of 1959. In February 1959, Anheuser-Busch acknowledged the brewery would open in March. A dedication ceremony for the brewery was scheduled in March, though the opening of the Busch Gardens would not take place until June when the brewery's beer would begin to ship. Manufacturing in the Busch brewery began on March 12. The brewery was dedicated on March 31, by August Busch Jr. with around 2,000 people in attendance, including the press, political and local leaders. Anheuser-Busch formally announced the operating hours of the Busch brewery and gardens in May. 

The brewery and gardens officially opened to the public for tours on June 1, 1959, as an admission-free facility with 250 attending the opening ceremony and around 1,000 attendees to Busch Gardens. The associated gardens featured lagoons and landscaping done by Charles B. Wedding, with around 36,000 flowering plants and 300 trees. Opening animal attractions for Busch Gardens included a bird show in an amphitheater seating around 200 individuals, a bird sanctuary featuring flamingos and a separate animal area named "Devil's Island," and caged enclosures for eagles and cockatoos. Additional attractions included a dwarf village and the "Hospitality House," a William B. Harvard designed facility that sampled free beer to guests. Another  was used for housing the brewers Budweiser Clydesdales, and planned to host buffalo, ostriches, and zebras located east of the brewery. The original gardens was later dubbed the "Bird Gardens".

1959–1968: Additions and African veldt 

A $5 million expansion was announced in July 1959 by Anheuser-Busch to the existing facility because of the newfound success. The dome, named the Adolphus Busch Space Frame, was constructed from anodized aluminum colored gold and located north of the bird amphitheater. The dome featured landscaping, suspended birds nests, and ponds that connected to a lagoon outside. Anheuser-Busch revealed its plan to construct the "Stairway to the Stars" attraction in October that would be a  Otis escalator to the roof of the brewery. The escalator opened on March 22, 1961, as part of a renovation to the Busch brewery and its public tours. The escalator featured a  pool beneath, a  observation deck atop of the brewery, and a  raised walkway to enter Busch Gardens. The pool originally hosted penguins.

Anheuser-Busch bought additional parcels of land in May 1962. In the same month, Anheuser-Busch communicated its intentions to expand Busch Gardens at the cost of $3.5 to $4 million as the company projected a rise in attendance for the coming decade necessitating growth. The expansion called for different themed lands, with an African veldt and the American Plains being planned, accompanied by wildlife animals pertaining to each geography. The additions would also call for a railway and create more landscaped environments for animal habitats. In October, Busch Gardens expanded its animal collection to around 1,000 birds. As part of the expansion, Anheuser-Busch detailed a monorail to be constructed through the African veldt in January 1963, and a four-story Swiss-themed restaurant in December, both east of the brewery. Another land purchase was made by Anheuser-Busch in April 1964, their third since the opening. Thomas J. Pinta was named manager of Busch Gardens in July. Busch Gardens debuted a trackless transportation train on October 1, to travel between the gardens and the Old Swiss House via the parking lot. The Old Swiss House was completed in October.  
The "Wild Animal Kingdom" representing the African veldt was completed in 1965, in addition to a clock tower built adjacent to the Old Swiss House. The African veldt contained a variety of animals mostly imported from Africa, including cheetahs, chimpanzees, elephants, gorillas, lions, and rhinos with habitats faithfully recreated by the park.

A portion of the 1965 land purchase would be used for a trackless transportation train to shuttle guests between a new parking lot and its facilities in the latter half of 1966. Busch Gardens began charging guests for parking in August because of the increase in visitors and to offset costs. The monorail, originally named the Skyrail, opened to the general public on September 22. Near the end of 1966, around 475 animals were exhibited in the African veldt. A snack bar was constructed and opened in the parking lot in 1967.

1969–1975: Boma and themed area expansions 

For the coming year, Anheuser-Busch announced in March 1969 a  zoo area expansion entitled "Boma" to the current gardens. The exhibit space would be priced at $1 million, located between the brewery and the monorail, and contribute to the growth of the brewery and park. Busch Gardens saw short manager changes with Pinta being replaced by Franklin H. Rust in May 1969, and Rust resigning in February 1970. With the development of Disney World near Orlando, Florida, Anheuser-Busch signaled its intentions to expand its animal habitats. August Busch Jr. had toured the Disney World site and wanted the Tampa brewery and gardens to maintain its hold in the tourist market. The Anheuser-Busch Tampa location was favored amongst its other four properties, being the company's leading model into the entertainment industry.

During the preview event for the Boma area in June 1970, Anheuser-Busch announced a $12.6 million expansion for the coming decade. The expansion would initially call for the additions of an amphitheater seating 1,000 guests, a "tree tops" viewing platform of the African veldt, a locomotive train, and a log flume. The plans also stipulated the end of free-admission and charging a general admission to the park as well as getting rid of parking admission. General admission to the park was implemented on July 31, coinciding with the opening of the Boma area that featured African mammals, birds, and a manmade mountain. The initial price of entry to the park was $1.25 for adults and ¢50 for children. The park's entrance was relocated during the same day to an adjacent road. The immediate extension of Busch Gardens called for the construction of a railroad, African village, and an amphitheater in the following years.

Robert B. Bean was named the new general manager for the Busch Gardens park in April 1971. The Trans-Veldt Railway opened on July 4, between the monorail and Boma section. The train departed from the "Nairobi Junction" station into the animal habitat and was an upcharge attraction. In January 1972, the tree tops observation deck was being constructed at the cost of $250,000, opening months later with the African village on June 19. The African village, located north of the original gardens, accommodated the Stanleyville station, an additional train station on the Trans-Veldt Railway. The African village contained the Tanzanian Theater featuring an elephant show, gorilla and okapi enclosures, and various shops. The tree tops was a three-level observation deck in the northern half of the African veldt and only reachable by the Trans-Veldt Railway upon opening. During this time, the monorail and railway upcharges were eliminated, with the general admission increased in price. The boat ride in the African village, titled Livingstone's Landing, later opened in the summer 1972.

A further $6.5 million was detailed in March 1973 for a phase two development of the 1970 expansion plans. The plans would affect three park sections: Boma, Stanleyville (renamed from the African village), and the African veldt. The plans called for a Morocco-themed area, a log flume, a dark ride, a gondola lift, an "animal training center," and a safari attraction. Busch Gardens opened a nearby campervan park in May. The first thrill ride at the park, the log flume, opened in June in the Stanleyville section. Bean resigned as general manager and was replaced by Joseph C. Fincher in April 1974. The sky ride transportation gondola opened in May, which linked the park's monorail station, tree tops outlook, and Stanleyville section together. 

By 1975, the park housed over 800 animals and expanded its live entertainment options throughout the park. Busch Gardens opened its Morocco-themed village on April 16, acting as the new entrance to the park. The Morocco area hosted shops, landscaped areas, eateries, and the Algiers Theater upon opening. The snack bar originally located in the parking lot was incorporated into the Morocco area with thematic upgrades. In September, the park disclosed a $7.6 million development that would include the park's first roller coaster, exhibits for tigers and elephants, extension to the Livingstone's Landing, extensive landscaping, and the addition of sound systems throughout the park.

1975–1989: The Dark Continent and continued growth 

Near the end of 1975, Busch Gardens launched a new campaign that sought to promote the Tampa park around a centralized older Africa theme. The rebrand of the Busch Gardens park would introduce aspects of live entertainment, advertising, animal displays, and thrill rides. The beginning of the 1976 year saw the park take on a new name as "The Dark Continent". The Dark Continent was chosen to distinguish Busch Gardens from other comparably named attractions in Florida, such as the Tiki Gardens and Sunken Gardens. As part of the campaign, the African veldt became known as the Serengeti Plain, Boma became Nairobi, and the Moroccan village was formally dubbed Marrakesh. 

Work on the last part of the $7.6 million development, another themed area specified as the Congo, began in January 1976. Python, a steel roller coaster manufactured by Arrow Development, premiered on July 1, as the park's first roller coaster. A octopus-style flat ride, named the Monstrous Mamba, constructed by the Eyerly Aircraft Company was opened shortly after in 1976. Both additions were part of Stanleyville and located in the northern half of the section. A marching brass group known as the "Mystic Sheiks of Morocco" began performing throughout the park in 1976. The Congo section opened on July 26, 1977, next to Stanleyville and located northwest in the park's layout. The Congo incorporated the Python roller coaster and Monstrous Mamba into its themed land. The land saw the transformation of Livingstone's Landing into the African Queen boat ride. In addition, the land hosted a shooting gallery, the Bengal tiger's Claw Island exhibit, and an Intamin swing ride entitled the Swinging Vines. Bumper cars were opened in 1977.

An unspecified addition to the park was disclosed in May 1978 at a cost of between $5 and $10 million, including a large dining facility. Construction was well underway in November for the expansion entitled Timbuktu. In February 1979, the park unveiled a $18.5 million expansion that would include the Timbuktu addition and a new water park adjacent to the park called Adventure Island. The Timbuktu addition would mark the 20th anniversary of the park's opening. It would also connect the Congo and Nairobi sections, include a large dining facility, several attractions, and an amphitheater. The Trans Veldt Railway operated a new station in the area in 1979. Continuing with the back-to-back developments for the past years was the announcement of a $20 million hotel in April, though was later delayed. Parts of the Timbuktu section began to open in late-1979, with the dolphin show and games being of note.   

At the beginning of 1980, the park was operated by the newly formed Busch Entertainment Corporation, a subsidiary of Anheuser-Busch, to separately manage its entertainment and beer assets. In the early 1980s, the tree tops observation platform closed in favor of a Congo train station. A variety show debuted in the since renamed Stanleyville Theater in 1980. The park officially opened the Timbuktu section of the park in January 1980. The section opened with a Chance Rides carousel and trabant, a dolphin show in the Dolphin Theater, the Sandstrom orbiter, the Festhaus dining hall with a dance show, an airplane ride, various game booths, and specialty shops. Scorpion, a Schwarzkopf steel roller coaster, later opened in Timbuktu on May 16. To boost attendance in the park, Busch Gardens revealed plans for a $6 million river rapids ride for the Congo section in 1981. In 1982, the Old Swiss House closed indefinitely for structural renovations and white tigers were introduced to the park in the Claw Island exhibit. The  Intamin Congo River Rapids ride opened on May 26. 

For the 1983 season, Busch Gardens added children rides to the Timbuktu and Congo sections. Additionally, the Marrakesh Theater opened in the southern portion of the Marrakesh area with a Moroccan-American dance show. In the latter half of 1983, Dwarf Village was reconstructed to appeal to younger audiences. The Dwarf Village reopened with a miniature log flume, a car ride, and various play areas. In November, Anheuser-Busch issued its intentions to deemphasize and slowly shift away from "The Dark Continent" name in favor of "Busch Gardens" as the name did not catch on with park visitors and was not as recognizable. The return of the prominent Busch Gardens name would bring changes to the slogan and logo. The following year, an Intamin looping starship, Phoenix, opened in the Timbuktu section on June 5, 1984. The eagle enclosure was relocated to a different location under the brewery escalator in January 1985. A new elephant habitat was created in the Nairobi section in 1986. The Moroccan Palace Theater was completed on August 11, and debuted the show, Kaleidoscope, on August 22. Upon its opening, the Moroccan Palace Theater was the park's main venue to host larger style productions. An animal nursery, named the Nairobi Field Station, opened on December 9.

The bird show gained a birds of prey segment including falcons, eagles, and owls in February 1987. Busch Gardens leased a pair of pandas from the Chinese government in October 1987, with a temporary  exhibit opening in the bird gardens on November 17. To accommodate the pandas, new bird aviaries were built in the gardens. The first panda on loan left in April 1988 while the second left in October 1988. The monorail received electric trains in 1988. The aviary dome was removed in the same year due to the expansion of the brewery. By the end of 1988, park officials were considering several additions such as a new boat ride, another show for the Moroccan Palace theater, new exhibit spaces, and reopening the Old Swiss House. The park had started a refurbishment of the Zagora Café and relocated the white tigers to the panda's previous enclosure. Busch Gardens officials planned to launch promotions to attract the European tourist market and draw on its unique position in the Florida amusement park industry.  

For the park's 30th anniversary, Busch Gardens announced in May 1989 a shoot the chute water ride named the Tanganyika Tidal Wave, a koala exhibit, and a Clydesdale stable for the coming year. Previews of the Intamin-made Tanganyika Tidal Wave began on June 15, and officially opened weeks later. The water ride replaced the African Queen boat ride and featured a nature walk named the Orchid Canyon. The koalas exhibit opened in the previous panda enclosure on June 28. The Clydesdale Hamlet opened south of the monorail station on August 11, housing four Clydesdale horses. The Moroccan Palace Theater's first show, Kaleidoscope, was replaced  by an ice skating show titled, Around the World on Ice, in November.

1990–1999: Thrill additions and animal habitats 
By the early 1990s, Busch Gardens sought to add more attractions to keep the attention of the public and to keep up with amusement industry trends. The last major attraction, the panda exhibit, debuted in 1988, officials acknowledging the park was due for another addition. The campervan park was closed in 1990 due to the decline in sales. The former Old Swiss House reopened as the Crown Colony House in early 1990. A restaurant was added on the top floor of the renovated building utilizing an African theme. The Swinging Vines attraction was removed around 1991. The park announced Questor in May 1991, a motion simulator ride manufactured by Reflectone, which opened on May 23. Located near the Clydesdale stables and Crown Colony House, Questor featured the story of explorer Sir Edison Fitzwilly pursuing the Crystal of Zed through different landscapes. 
To maintain its hold in the Florida theme park market, Busch Gardens unveiled plans to construct the Myombe Reserve, a  chimpanzee and gorilla exhibit that would replace the Boma section. The exhibit opened on June 17, 1992, with its entrance located near the Moroccan Palace Theater. The park hosted a temporary Olympic village for the U.S. team in July as a sponsor of the 1992 Summer Olympics. Continuing efforts to expand, the park revealed its plans to construct a signature steel roller coaster within the Congo section named Kumba in November. Manufactured by Bolliger & Mabillard, the roller coaster was established in the northwest area of the park near the Congo River Rapids and bumper cars. In 1994, a kids area titled the Land of the Dragons was earmarked to replace the Dwarf Village. The Stanleyville variety show saw its production close in 1994, after fourteen years, and a new ice skating show debut in the Moroccan Palace Theater titled, Hollywood Live on Ice, in November.

The construction of the Wild Animal Kingdom prompted Busch Gardens to map out a competitive strategy for the coming years in preparation for its first direct competitor in the Florida theme park market. The Land of the Dragons opened on May 9, 1995, debuting on a  area featuring a large three-story tree house, miniature cars, a ferris wheel, and rope bridge. The dragon rethemed addition was done to update the area and was adopted from its sister park in Williamsburg. The success of Kumba prompted the park to file plans for an Egypt section in May that would include the park's fourth roller coaster, shopping, and a train station. Additional details of the Egypt land were revealed in August. Anheuser-Busch stated its intentions to close the brewery inside the Busch Gardens Tampa location on October 25. The plant on the Busch Gardens property had become the smallest brewery of the company's 13 and was slated to close down because of the decreased beer consumption and high per-barrel costs. The shutdown was part of an overall restructuring effort, with the  land transferred to the park. The Monstrous Mamba flat ride closed in the fall season. A safari upcharge attraction was opened to the public in November riding through the Serengeti Plain section. The park's brewery closed in December and was later demolished.

The park began expanding its international marketing efforts in Brazil, Germany, and the United Kingdom in 1996. In addition, the park hosted another temporary Olympic village as a sponsor of the 1996 Summer Olympics. The Egypt section opened to guests on May 16, located in the south east portion of the park at the cost of $5 million. The section included a recreation of King Tut's tomb, a sand pit, Egyptian hieroglyphs structures, and the Bolliger & Mabillard inverted roller coaster, Montu. Montu was created at the cost of $10 million, opening as the world's longest and tallest inverted roller coaster. Busch Gardens entered a theme park partnership in June with SeaWorld Orlando, Universal Studios Florida, and Wet 'n Wild Orlando to compete with Disney. In the same month, the park considered the feasibility of a hotel, the latest effort since the 1980s. In October, park officials disclosed plans for a animal exhibit section at the cost of $20 million.

General manager Fincher was replaced by Robin D. Carson in a corporate shuffle in February 1997. The Edge of Africa animal exhibit section opened on July 4. Located in the middle of the park on a  parcel of the Serengeti Plain, the animal exhibit featured crocodiles, hippos, hyenas, lions, meerkats, and vultures among an African village and wildlife themes. Plans for an entertainment complex, the likes that would rival Disney's Animal Kingdom, were in the planning stages in December 1997. Further improvements to the park were disclosed, including an refurbished simulator ride and a bird walk through exhibit. An arcade area would open in the Egypt section in April 1998. The simulator ride, Akbar's Adventure Tours, opened on May 12, replacing Questor. The walk through Lory Landing bird exhibit opened in May 5, near the Land of the Dragons. In June, updated plans for the entertainment complex cited a $10 million ride to open in the coming year, which would later be revealed as the dueling wooden roller coasters, Gwazi, in July. Busch Gardens purchased a  area north of San Antonio, Florida, for an animal retirement facility in September. 

In the ensuing year, the Tangiers Theater was replaced by a confectionary store. The monorail closed on May 13, 1999, with demolition occurring on the same day. Gwazi opened on June 18, on the former site of the Anheuser-Busch brewery. The park would debut its first family-friendly Halloween event, titled the Spooky Safari, in October. Occurring in the same month, the San Antonio facility for the park's animals opened, as well as plans to revitalize the Serengeti Plain were announced. Landscaping and physical barriers were planned to separate animals, bring wildlife closer to the train, and include several animals such as antelopes, gazelles, giraffes, and zebras. Another ice skating show, World Rhythms on Ice, debuted in the Morocco Palace Theater in November.

2000–2009: Updates and end of Anheuser-Busch ownership 
Up to 2000, Busch Gardens' manager, Carson, had replaced several long-time executives and created a new leadership team to rejuvenate the park because of the growing competition from other Florida theme parks. Instead of investing in technologically innovative and expensive rides, the park sought to attract guests through unique experiences with interactive wildlife elements. The park began advertising its location as a holiday destination within the Tampa Bay area as Disney had done in Orlando. To retain attendance from returning visitors, Anheuser-Busch began offering a "Fun Card" to Florida residents at their Busch Gardens Tampa and SeaWorld Orlando theme parks beginning in 2000. The pass would provide benefits and ability to visit the park to the end of the year and would replace most of its discount programs previously offered. Park officials revealed plans to construct Rhino Rally in May, a Land Rover safari attraction for the coming year. The revitalized  land of the Serengeti Plain debuted to the public on June 22, including an add-on tour in a truck through the animal habitat. Busch Gardens premiered a Halloween event from the previous year, Howl-O-Scream, in October adopting the event from its sister park in Williamsburg after its success and in hopes of challenging Universal's own Halloween event.

After its success, the Fun Card was reintroduced in 2001 for Florida residents. Rhino Rally opened to the public on May 23. After the events on September 11 attacks, Anheuser-Busch temporarily closed its parks, but reopened the following day. In the wake of the attacks, Busch Gardens temporarily offered coupons for hotels and gas to attract consumers close-by. Starting in June 2002, the park was the first Florida to offer a second day free entrance when it rained during a guests stay. In August, the park indicated it would replace its Dolphin Theater with a 4D film theater. Several projects were proposed to open during the 2003 season, including a white rhino habitat, an add-on zoo keeper experience, a revitalized Timbuktu area with the Das Festhaus restaurant being rethemed, and the premiere of the 4D film, Haunted Lighthouse. A new logo would also be introduce to phase out an old one used for 20 years prior. General manager Carson was replaced by Dan Brown in mid-May. The 4D film debuted in the newly constructed 750-seat theater in May, with the Timbuktu revamp and the Kasbah restaurant scheduled to open soon after. The  area for the three white rhinos from South Africa debuted in June. 

Starting in June 2003, Busch Gardens introduced the "Summer Nights" event offering extended hours during the summer season nights. The park began construction in late-2003 on its parking lot to accommodate new tunnels to be built under McKinley Drive for easier access to the park. With August Busch III taking more interest in the Anheuser-Busch parks to help in monetary gains, Busch Gardens also announced an overhaul to its entertainment options. A permanent replacement for an ice show in the Moroccan Theater, named Katonga, would come the following year, and a temporary Sesame Street show would be introduced in the coming months. Park officials also formally scrap the hotel entertainment complex plan. Busch Entertainment disclosed it would move its wild mouse roller coaster, Wild Maus, from Busch Gardens Williamsburg to its Tampa park and replace the Crazy Camel trabant flat ride.

The Kasbah restaurant would be renamed the Desert Grill in 2004. The wild mouse roller coaster, Cheetah Chase, opened in February. The Broadway-equivalent show, KaTonga, debuted on April 8, in the Moroccan Palace Theater. The park announced in October the construction of SheiKra, a  steel roller coaster to be located in the Stanleyville section and built by Bolliger and Mabillard. In January 2005, the park implemented fingerprint scans to replace ticket photo identification, deployed kiosks for self-service, and a new entrance. A gift shop in the bird gardens was reintroduced as the Xcursions shop. In addition, construction on the road tunnel for transportation trams and parking were completed and opened on January 7. SheiKra opened on May 21, becoming the tallest roller coaster in Florida and the first Dive Coaster model built in the United States. A barbeque restaurant also opened within the confines of the Stanleyville section.  

Busch Gardens Tampa Bay was marketed in the short term as Busch Gardens Africa beginning in 2006 to distinguish the Tampa park from its Williamsburg counterpart, which had similarly adopted "Europe" to its name. The name change came as part of an effort to distinguish both parks as unique from each other and to drive more visitors. However, the use of Tampa Bay would still be used in local marketing. By 2006, the park had also updated five activity areas. A new 4D film, Pirates 4-D, debuted in the Timbuktu Theater on February 18, replacing the Haunted Lighthouse. After 30 years of operation, the Python roller coaster closed on October 31, for a planned expansion in 2008. The closure included part of the Congo section surrounding the roller coaster, including the Claw Island exhibit and a restaurant. 

The park's bird show in the Bird Gardens ended in 2007, after 48 years of production. The bird show would later be replaced by an animal show titled, Critter Castaways. The roller coaster, SheiKra, closed temporarily in May 2007 and reopened in June with floorless trains. Busch Gardens revealed its plans in September to build a $16 million dollar section, named Jungala, where the Python roller coaster once stood. The  land would house several animal habitats, involving Bengal tigers, Tomistoma, flying foxes, gibbons, and orangutans. The area would also host several attractions that included a "mini space shot", a sit-down zip line, a play area, educational areas, and restaurants. General manager was taken over by Donnie Mills, as Brown left for a position at Busch Entertainment in December.

The previous Nairobi Field Station was renamed Jambo Junction in January 2008. Jungala opened on April 5, at a higher estimated cost of around $40 million. The park section was marketed for age groups between older adolescents and young teenagers, who would be too young for their SheiKra roller coaster but too old for the Land of the Dragons area. Belgian brewer InBev was reported in May to make a potential bid for Anheuser-Busch. The bid by InBev came when consolidation of companies was largely taking place and amid national competition for Anheuser-Busch. The Belgian brewer considered the sale of the Busch Entertainment division to help fund its buyout of Anheuser-Busch, which composed of ten theme parks including Busch Gardens Tampa Bay. InBev formally proposed its bid to Anheuser-Busch's board of directors on June 11. By June 26, Anheuser-Busch contemplated restructuring and dropping some of its assets, such as Busch Entertainment, to strengthen its profitability and rationalize its refusal of InBev's bid. The next day, InBev filed suit to prepare a facilitated takeover bid of Anheuser-Busch through the removal of its board of directors. InBev formally drafted its takeover bid on July 7, placing speculation as to a possible buyer for Busch parks, anticipated changes to park operations, and its identity. 

A friendly agreement between Anheuser-Busch and InBev was negotiated on July 13, forming Anheuser-Busch InBev. In the deal, InBev reaffirmed the merger would be funded by the sale of subsidiary assets, which added into the uncertain future of Busch Gardens Tampa park. It was theorized the Busch Entertainment parks may form their own company, be sold off independently, or be bought together. Potential buying participants were speculated, to be the Blackstone Group, Cedar Fair, Parques Reunidos, and Six Flags, as all were operating parks domestically or globally. In early August, it was reported that the Blackstone Group, operating Merlin Entertainment, and Parques Reunidos, were emerging to bid for the Busch parks. Talks of the acquisition were ongoing in November, with industry officials signaling a deal might take place during summer in 2009. As part of its plan to sell off Busch parks, Anheuser-Busch InBev ceased free beer samples for guests at the beginning of 2009, having been in place since the parks opening. The park also deemphasize Anheuser-Busch products by reducing, removing, or replacing several offerings. For the park's 50th anniversary, park officials asked the public to bring in memorabilia to be displayed in a temporary historic museum. The building that housed the former Akbar's Adventure Tour simulator ride and U.S. Horseshow Jumping Hall of Fame was turned into a museum in March, with guest and corporate contributions displayed.

In June 2009, it was anticipated the Busch Gardens Tampa park would replace its Land of the Dragons area with a Sesame Street area as its Williamsburg sister park had completed. Busch Gardens revealed its intentions in August to build the kids area, with the plans calling to enlarge the section, add a kids roller coaster, and retheme several attractions to fit the Sesame Street theme. Rumors of Busch Gardens' sale were reported in September, as the Blackstone Group was becoming more prominent to purchase the parks, with a deal close in October. Anheuser-Busch InBev announced it would sell Busch Entertainment to the Blackstone Group on October 7. The acquisition saw the Clydesdale horses removed, but allow the continuation of the Busch Gardens name, as well as previous programs, employees, and leadership from before its purchase. Busch Gardens Tampa Bay began to be operated by the renamed SeaWorld Parks & Entertainment division in December, with the last Anheuser-Busch symbols from the park taken out.

2010–present: New ownership and additions 

General manager Mills was replaced by Jim Dean in the role as park president in February 2010. The Mystic Sheiks of Morocco band ceased performances in 2010, and a new 4-D film based on the Sesame Street cast would debut in the Timbuktu Theater, replacing Pirates 4-D. The Sesame Street section opened as Sesame Street Safari of Fun on March 27, on a  area. A walk through kangaroo enclosure, titled the Walkabout Way, opened in the Bird Gardens area on June 14. The long running show, KaTonga, would end its production on September 6. Busch Gardens announced two attractions for the coming year on October 13, with an Intamin-made launched roller coaster named Cheetah Hunt located in the former monorail station and a cheetah enclosure titled Cheetah Run. KaTonga's replacement, Cirque Dreams Jungle Fantasy, debuted on December 3. 

Busch Gardens disclosed on May 16, 2011, a replacement to the old rhinoceros enclosure with a  "Animal Care & Nutrition Center". Cheetah Hunt and its associated Cheetah Run enclosure opened on May 27. Disney discontinued their Grad Night event in 2011, leading to Busch Gardens to pick up its own event for graduating local high schools. A replacement for the short-lived Cirque Dreams, titled Iceploration, was detailed in September, being the largest show production in the park's history.

Busch Gardens opened its Animal Care Center on January 23, 2012, at an estimated cost of $5 million in the Nairobi section. The Iceploration show debuted on February 2. A winter event, titled Christmas Town premiered in November and would continue on into December. SeaWorld Parks & Entertainment changed the logo and slogan of its Busch Gardens parks in February 2013, choosing a "coaster tree" to represent the park's environment and rides. The Stanleyville Theater was enclosed in 2013 and would debut a Madagascar themed show on May 18. The Sandstorm orbiter flat ride would close in June, which would make way for a  drop tower named Falcon's Fury to open within the next year. The Intamin-made drop tower would be located in the Timbuktu section and drop riders face down. The park's Crown Colony restaurant closed indefinitely by mid-2013, with industry observers citing budget cuts and slow attendance for the change in operation. Busch Gardens later revealed in November a retheme of the Timbuktu section into "Pantopia", where Falcon's Fury would be located. The Pantopia section would feature a vibrant color pallet for existing buildings, introduce a new story line for the fictional land and refreshments, keep existing rides, and open with the drop tower.

The animal show, Critter Castaways, in the Bird Gardens Theater would be moved to the Pantopia Theater following the former theater's closure in February 2014, which was subsequently demolished having been at the park since its opening. Within the same month, the park opted into Tampa's City Pass alongside other local zoos and aquariums. Falcon's Fury was delayed from its initial opening date on May 1, though, the Pantopia section officially opened. The drop tower would later open on September 2, after varied soft-openings. The safari attraction Rhino Rally permanently closed in September. The park would disclose in December that wooden roller coasters Gwazi would close in the coming months due to rising costs in operation and feedback from guests. Gwazi closed on February 1, 2015, after 15 years of operation. A new attraction for the Egypt section was disclosed in February 2015, to come the next year. A replacement of the park's Bands, Brew, and BBQ event debuted in March, as the Food and Wine Festival. Busch Gardens formally announced its Egyptian addition in May as Cobra's Curse, a spinning roller coaster to debut the following year. The previous Desert Grill reopened as the Dragon Fire Grill on June 1.

The Tanganyika Tidal Wave closed on April 10, 2016, with no plans to replace the attraction. The former Crown Colony opened with the addition of a new restaurant in May. The spinning roller coaster, Cobra's Curse, opened on June 17, in the Egypt section of the park adjacent to Montu. The Jambo Junction animal center closed indefinitely on December 9, due to corporate layoffs. Stewart Clark replaced Dean as Busch Gardens President in January 2017 following the formers departure to become President of Orlando's SeaWorld parks. By April, the Iceploration show ended its performance in the Moroccan Palace Theater, replaced by Turn It Up during the summer months. Free beer samples returned to the park in May 2018, being hosted within the former Hospitality House since renamed to the Garden Gate Cafe. A Premier Rides triple-launch roller coaster, named Tigris, was announced in September to open the following year.

The park would later announce in March 2019 the replacement for Gwazi as Iron Gwazi, a Rocky Mountain Construction conversion of the wooden roller coasters into a steel roller coaster. Busch Gardens opened Tigris, its ninth roller coaster, on April 19. Iron Gwazi, was expected to be completed by Spring 2020, however, due to the COVID-19 pandemic in Florida, the park temporarily closed from March 16 to June 11, to assist in slowing down the exposure of guests. As a result of the pandemic, the opening of Iron Gwazi was initially delayed until 2021. SeaWorld Entertainment parks as a whole saw a 96% drop in attendance figures. Busch Gardens Tampa Bay named Neal Thurman as its new president in August, amid Clark leaving to pursue a role at SeaWorld Entertainment in September. Iron Gwazi, after several months of previews, opened on March 11, 2022. A new entrance plaza, entertainment, and pass member lounge were planned in April to come during the season. Busch Gardens Tampa Bay announced in October the Serengeti Flyer, a S&S Screamin' Swing, scheduled to debut in Spring 2023. The former Garden Gate Cafe reopened as the Springs Taproom in January 2023.

Park layout and attractions 

 The Serengeti Express, a  narrow-gauge railway, consists of a steam train that runs along the back end of the park and makes stops at the Nairobi, Congo and Stanleyville themed areas.
 The Skyride transports guests between the Edge of Africa (near Cheetah Hunt) and Stanleyville.

Morocco 
The park's main entrance. Treats can be purchased at the Sultan's Sweets and the Zagora Cafe. The Moroccan Palace is located here, as well as the outdoor Marrakesh Theater.

 Gwazi Gliders, a small hang glider flat ride relocated from the Congo section's defunct Pygmy Village kids' area.
Myombe Reserve, a  home for six lowland gorillas and nine chimpanzees located in Nairobi, opened in 1992.
Moroccan Palace, A palace themed theater nearby Myombe Reserve chimpanzee entrance. It is home for Busch Gardens's newly award-winning ice skating show, Turn It Up! The Hottest Show On Ice.
Iron Gwazi, a hybrid wooden-steel roller coaster. In 2019, Busch Gardens Tampa announced that a new hybrid coaster would be built on the space where Gwazi once stood. It was built by world-famous roller coaster manufacturer Rocky Mountain Construction. Upon its opening, it became North America's tallest hybrid coaster as well as the world's fastest and steepest hybrid coaster.

Sesame Street Safari of Fun 
Former "Land of the Dragons" children's section of the park. Land of the Dragons, which itself replaced the Dwarf Village in 1995, was replaced by Sesame Street Safari of Fun on March 27, 2010. It contains all the attractions from Land of the Dragons which are now re-themed. 
 Telly's Jungle Jam, an interactive play area.
 Rosita's Djembe Fly-Away, a swing ride.
 Bert & Ernie's Watering hole, a water play area.
Air Grover, a children's roller coaster.

Stanleyville 
This section of the park is home to one of the park's water rides, Stanley Falls Flume. It is also home to launch coaster Tigris, and SheiKra, which was the first and only Dive Coaster in the United States until the addition of Griffon at the sister park Busch Gardens Williamsburg. The section opened in 1973 with the addition of the Stanley Falls Flume. The African Queen Boat Ride opened in 1977 as Busch's version of Disney's Jungle Cruise. The African Queen featured live animals, including alligators, crocodiles, rhinoceroses and spider monkeys. A South American macaw rode on each boat. In 1989, the African Queen Boat Ride was converted into Tanganyika Tidal Wave with the addition of a  drop that generates a large splash. The section remained unchanged until 2005 when SheiKra opened and the surrounding area was renovated.

SheiKra, a  Bolliger & Mabillard floorless dive roller coaster with a 90-degree vertical drop. This was North America's first vertical dive coaster. The ride originally operated with floors until these were replaced with floorless trains in 2007. The ride was repainted in 2013.
 Stanley Falls Flume, a log flume with a  drop.
Tigris, a Premier Rides Sky Rocket II. It is located on the site of Tanganyika Tidal Wave. Tigris officially opened on April 19, 2019.

Congo 

This section, themed to the jungles of Congo, contains two of the park's rides, Kumba and Congo River Rapids. In November 2006, Congo underwent a major renovation, including the removal of the park's Python corkscrew roller coaster. Other former Congo attractions include the Swinging Vines, a family swing flat ride which closed in the early 1990s and the Monstrous Mamba octopus flat ride which closed in the late 1990s. The Pygmy Village kids area featuring three children's rides, a teacup ride, a kiddie swing ride relocated to Sesame Street Safari of Fun and the Gwazi Gliders moved to Morocco.

 Kumba, meaning roar in Swahili, is a  steel sit-down roller coaster with seven inversions. Built in 1993 by Bolliger & Mabillard, it remains a popular ride today. The ride was repainted in 2010, and again in 2019.
Congo River Rapids, a river rapids ride opened in 1982. The queue also houses a Komodo dragon exhibit.
Ubanga Banga Bumper Cars, a bumper cars ride.

Jungala 
Opened on April 5, 2008, Jungala is a  family attraction featuring up-close animal encounters, rope bridges to explore three stories of jungle life, and a water-play area for children. Also located in this area are two family attractions: Jungle Flyers, a zip line that offers three different flight patterns above the treetops of the new area, and Wild Surge, a shot tower that launches guests above a waterfall. Another attraction is Tiger Trail, which is a walkthrough with tigers where there is also a glass turret where guests can look out right in the middle of the tiger enclosure. During the Kareebu Jungala atmosphere show, stiltwalkers perform with puppets and interact with guests in the heart of Jungala.
Jungle Fliers, a zip line ride (closed as of 2018).
The Wild Surge, a Moser family launch tower ride.
Orangutan Outpost, a tree-top observation platform to watch and interact with Bornean orangutans. As of 2017, Busch Gardens has 6 orangutans including 3 males and 3 females.
 Tiger Lodge and Tiger Trail, Observation areas, trails and a bridge to watch and interact with tigers. Busch Gardens has at least 10 tigers. On March 31, 2013, Bzui, a female Malayan tiger, gave birth to three cubs sired by Mata. She had two males and one female. The males were named Bundar (meaning round) and Rukayah (meaning delicate). The female was named Cinta (meaning love).
 Kulu Canopy, A multi-species habitat for white-cheeked gibbons, flying foxes (fruit bats) and false gharial - a reclusive and very rare crocodilian native to Indonesia and Malaysia.

Pantopia 

A section originally themed after the malls and bazaars of Africa that opened up in May 1980 as Timbuktu. The Phoenix was built in 1984. The section was renovated in 2003. Elements added during this facelift included the enclosing of the Timbuktu Theater, which replaced the park's Dolphin Theater with an indoor 4-D movie theater. The dolphins retired to other locations. The 4-D theater premiered with "R.L Stine's Haunted Lighthouse" film in 2003, followed by "Pirates 4-D" in 2006 and "Sesame Street Presents: Lights! Camera! Imagination!" in 2010. In 2004, Das Festhaus was transformed into the Desert Grill, and the park's family-friendly Sand Serpent wild mouse roller coaster opened, replacing the Crazy Camel Trabant flat ride. In September 2014, Falcon's Fury, a 335-foot drop tower, opened, replacing the former Sandstorm orbiter flat ride. This section of the park was re-themed to Pantopia alongside the opening of Falcon's Fury.

 Scorpion, a steel, Schwarzkopf-designed sit-down roller coaster with one vertical loop. It is Busch Gardens' oldest operating roller coaster.
Sand Serpent, a steel wild mouse roller coaster.
 Pantopia Theater, an indoor theater that originally housed Opening Night Critters with the opening of Pantopia in 2014. In Spring 2019, it is now home to Critters Inn Charge after Opening Night Critters closed.
 Caravan Carousel, a carousel with horses, camels, and chariots.

Nairobi 
Alligators and crocodiles can be observed here up close. In Curiosity Cavern, guests can view mammal and reptile exhibits. Visitors to Nairobi can meet the Animal Ambassadors who travel the country and make educational appearances at Jambo Junction. The area also contains Myombe Reserve, a tropical rainforest that is home to western gorillas and chimpanzees. In 2012 the Animal Care Center opened, allowing guests to observe actual veterinary procedures, as well as meet the stars of Wildlife Docs, Busch Gardens' Saturday morning television show. The main train station at Busch Gardens is located at Nairobi. Another popular attraction here is the Asian elephant exhibit. Nairobi used to have a safari truck ride called Rhino Rally, similar to Kilimanjaro Safaris at Walt Disney World. The attraction closed in 2015.
Animal Care Center, a nearly  attraction, allows visitors the chance to view the Busch Gardens' veterinarians at work in a new state-of-the-art veterinary hospital. The major visitor aspects of the facility include a nutrition demonstration kitchen, treatment rooms, a clinical lab and an interactive diagnostic activity. Behind the scenes the veterinary hospital also includes the animal nutrition center, animal recovery and holding rooms and vet offices. The park's former animal care center was located behind the scenes.
 Elephant Interaction Wall, the Nairobi section of the park has five female and one male (arrived from the Calgary Zoo in 2013) Asian elephants. The females are named Tina who is 53 years old, Rosie who is 50 years old, Simba who is 52 years old, Carina who is 48 years old and Carnaudi who is 30 years old. There are daily interactions at the Elephant Interaction and Husbandry Wall or during the Elephant Keeper Experience.

Edge of Africa

Edge of Africa, otherwise known as Cheetah Hunt Plaza, is the smallest section of the park. It features a restaurant, The Serengeti Overlook Restaurant and Pub, the Cheetah Hunt roller coaster, and the Skyride station.
Cheetah Hunt, a multi-launch steel roller coaster that opened in 2011. A suspended monorail which took guests around the Serengeti Plain previously occupied Cheetah Hunt's station but had sat empty since the attraction closed in 1999.
Cheetah Run, an animal exhibit located next to Cheetah Hunt. It replaced the Clydesdale Hamlet. In May 2011, Cheetah Run opened. Cheetah Run is home to Busch Gardens Tampa Bay collection of cheetahs. There are running demonstrations and Meet a Keeper sessions throughout the day. In addition, the exhibit has interactive screens with cheetah facts. One of Cheetah Run's most notable residents is Kasi, a male cheetah, who was paired with Mtani, a female Labrador Retriever, from 2011 to 2013 when they were young. Mtani now lives with a zookeeper and Kasi has been paired with a female Cheetah. As of 2013, Busch Gardens has 14 cheetahs.

Egypt 

Bedouin tents, authentic handicrafts and art create an Egyptian marketplace feel. The primary attraction of the Egypt-themed area is Montu, an inverted steel coaster. Tut's Tomb, a former audio guided walk-through tomb excavation closed in Winter 2013 and the interior was gutted to make way for the queue for Cobra's Curse. The former Golden Scarab Gift Shop was converted into a gift shop at the exit of the attraction.
Cobra's Curse, a Mack Rides steel spinning coaster that replaced Tut's Tomb and opened on June 17, 2016.
Montu, named after the Egyptian falcon-god of war, a  steel inverted Bolliger & Mabillard roller coaster with seven inversions.

Animal habitats 
Busch Gardens is Tampa's largest zoo, with more than 200 species of animals.

Animal Care Center 
Facility that allows visitors to view animal care being conducted from treatments to x-rays.
 The Wildlife Docs, an Emmy nominated television series that follows animal caretakers treating more than 12,000 different animals living in Busch Gardens Tampa.

Bird Gardens 
A free flight aviary that shows over 500 tropical birds from around the globe including parrots, flamingos and others. The original section of the park opened in 1959. The area for the most part remains mostly gardens and animal exhibits. A staple attraction that once stood in this section was the brewery. However, the brewery closed in 1995 and Gwazi now sits where the brewery was located. In 2014, the Bird Gardens theater was demolished and the outdoor show (Critter Castaways) was relocated inside the Pantopia Theater under the new name "Opening Night Critters". This ran until December 2018 and the theater remains empty (as of February 2022).
Walkabout Way, themed as an Australian outpost, opened in June 2010. This area allows guests to hand-feed kangaroos and wallabies, and see animals including kookaburras, magpies, black swans and tawny frogmouths. A male kangaroo, Horatio, arrived at the park in early 2014. This experience is open to all guests 5 years of age or older.
 Lory Landing, an open aviary habitat that invites guest to walk around and be visited by lorikeets. Purchasing nectar is an optional part of the habitat, providing an experience of hand-feeding the birds.

Edge of Africa 
Opened in 1997, Edge of Africa is a walk-through attraction where guests can observe African animals. Among the exhibits are a Nile crocodile named Sobek, meerkats, two prides of lions, a pack of spotted hyenas, three hippos named Moyo, Kita and Devi, vultures, and a troop of lemurs.

The three newest members of the lion pride include a male named Kembe and two females named Shaba and Shtuko. They arrived at the park as cubs in 2013 from a zoo in Africa. Another pride of lions at the park include a male named Simon and two females named Rose and Iris. Iris and Rose are unable to have cubs as they have been spayed.

The hippos Moyo and Kita are never exhibited together, being father and daughter, and being unaware of this would try to mate with each other. Therefore, both are rotated into the exhibit and holding area day by day to avoid accidental inbreeding.

The Serengeti Plain 
In 1965, the park opened its Serengeti Plain animal habitat, the first of its kind to offer animals in a free-roaming environment. It is home to the Grévy's zebra, Grant's zebra, sable antelope, reticulated giraffe, Ankole-Watusi, addax, southern white rhinoceros, eland, impala, ostrich and marabou stork. Also, in a secluded area of this region is a solitary female eastern black rhinoceros named Jody.

Events 
From January to March, Busch Gardens hosts a weekly concert series which invites popular bands either in big band music or pop to perform classic or contemporary songs.

(Previously called Bud & BBQ and Bands, Brew & BBQ) For the months of March & April, Busch Gardens hosts a series of concerts in Gwazi Field, mostly from classic rock and country music acts. Sometimes the event includes alternative rock, pop, hip hop and R&B acts as well as comedians. Also, there are special culinary offerings that include a variety of ethnic food and wine samplings from various local vendors along the walkway from the Gwazi Roller Coaster to the gate in Gwazi Field. The documentary film Blackfish and a subsequent online petition led to several popular musical groups cancelling performances at SeaWorld and Busch Gardens "Bands, Brew & BBQ" event in 2014. This caused the removal of the event in Tampa, which was replaced by the annual Food and Wine Festival, resembling the one currently at Epcot in Walt Disney World Orlando. In March, several Latin music acts are hosted on the stage in Gwazi Field. There is a similar culinary setup with special offerings for the concert days as there is for Bands, Brew & BBQ. During summer months, the park stays open later and includes concerts by performers like David Cassidy and Starship with Mickey Thomas. The park's Independence Day festivities add fireworks to the entertainment lineup.

In 2010, Busch Gardens added a new nighttime show called Kinetix, the first special effect-heavy show put on in Gwazi Field. Also, they added many new special effects (i.e. Strobe, Lighting, Fog) to the existing rides just for the Summer Nights season. Kinetix discontinued after the 2016 Summer Nights. Since 2017, Busch Gardens Summer Nights now includes party zones where guests can dance with Party Starters and DJs to the music and compete for special prizes. The most major party zones are ¡Fiesta Festa! in the Cheetah Hunt Plaza and Tigris's Party Zone (formally Viben Village) in Stanleyville. On every Friday, Saturday and Sunday night, guests can compete in the "Dance Challenge" at Gwazi Park to win four free tickets to Adventure Island as well as a fireworks show directly afterward. In 2022, Busch Gardens Summer Nights was officially renamed to "Busch Gardens Summer Celebration," following general renovations to the park.

Every September and October since 2000, Busch Gardens is transformed into Howl-O-Scream. This event contains haunted houses, scare zones and shows. Howl-O-Scream is one of the top rated Halloween events in the United States. Howl-O-Scream has featured some attractions of the park turned into "horrified" attractions at night. This includes Serengeti Safari Tours, which was turned into Evening Serengeti Safari Tours and Curiosity Caverns, which was turned into Dark Cavern, both in 2000. In 2012, Howl-O-Scream celebrated 13 "unlucky" years.

From November to December, theaters throughout the park are transformed into Christmas-themed shows (Like Christmas On Ice in the Moroccan Palace) in celebration of the holiday season for an event called Christmas Town. The park is decorated with over a million Christmas lights and theming. At Snow World, guests may play in snow and ride down ice slides. This event was first introduced in 2012. At Santa's House, guests may bring their little ones and have pictures taken with Santa Claus, Mrs. Claus, and Santa's Elves next to the Nairobi Train Station which circles around the Serengeti Plain as the Christmas Town Sing Along Train featuring select Christmas carols and songs. Guests may also meet the stars from Rudolph the Red-Nosed Reindeer over in Rudolph's Winter Wonderland since 2016. Two Christmas Town princesses can be spotted in the Icy Forest (Ice Princess), and the poinsettia trees (Poinsettia Princess) which guests can also have pictures taken. Princess Fae, a sugarplum princess made her debut during the 2019 Christmas Town season. The poinsettia, sugarplum and icy princesses can also be seen together there near closing time.

During New Year's Eve, Busch Gardens celebrates the new year by hosting live music throughout the park, thrill rides opened through the night and fireworks located at the Gwazi Field. Including a park-wide countdown to the new year.

Awards and recognition

Rankings 
The following is a list of roller coasters at Busch Gardens Tampa that have placed on Amusement Today's award or nomination list, along with the highest ranking and year awarded or nominated. Busch Gardens Tampa has also been nominated for best landscaping in 1998 and 2007.

Steel 
 Montu: 2 (1999)
 Kumba: 4 (1998)
 SheiKra: 13 (2006)
 Cheetah Hunt: 29 (2011)
 Iron Gwazi: 29 (2022)

Wood 
 Gwazi: 40 (2007)

Attendance

See also 

Incidents at SeaWorld parks
SeaWorld San Antonio
SeaWorld San Diego
Sesame Place (Pennsylvania)

References

Bibliography

External links 

 Official website

1959 establishments in Florida
Tourist attractions in Tampa, Florida
Landmarks in Tampa, Florida
Amusement parks in Florida
Zoos in Florida
SeaWorld Parks & Entertainment
 
Buildings and structures in Tampa, Florida
Amusement parks opened in 1959
Zoos established in 1959